Stanton v. Stanton, 421 U.S. 7 (1975), is a United States Supreme Court case which struck down  Utah's definitions of adulthood as a violation of equal protection: females reached adulthood at 18; males at 21.

Background
The case had started in Utah state court. A divorced father stopped paying child support for his daughter when she turned eighteen, so the daughter's mother went to court to ask for support until both the daughter and the son reached twenty-one. Utah divorce court ruled against the mother, and the Utah Supreme Court held that there was a "reasonable basis" for the differential: women matured earlier and married younger; men had a greater need for education. The Utah court stated in its opinion that the basis for the law, though an "old notion," was not unconstitutional.

Opinion
Justice Blackmun wrote for the majority. He found a violation of equal protection and said the law failed under any standard, including rational basis (the Supreme Court's lowest standard of review). The decision remained in the context of child support, without considering different ages for males and females in other contexts.

The Stanton decision placed the Court on record as declaring that society's stereotypes were not a legitimate basis for official policies that treated men and women differently.

Blackmun wrote: "A child, male or female, is still a child... No longer is the female destined solely for the home and the rearing of the family, and only the male for the marketplace and the world of ideas... If a specified age of minority is required for the boy in order to assure him parental support while he attains his education and training, so, too, is it for the girl."

See also
 Gender equality
 List of gender equality lawsuits 
 List of United States Supreme Court cases, volume 421

References

External links

United States equal protection case law
United States Supreme Court cases
1975 in United States case law
United States family case law
Gender discrimination lawsuits
United States Supreme Court cases of the Burger Court
History of women in Utah